HMRS may refer to:
 Hawk Mountain Ranger School, a search and rescue school in Pennsylvania, United States
Historical Model Railway Society, a British organisation